Abrahim is a surname and a given name, a variant of Ibrahim. Notable people with the surname include:

Surname
Warwick Abrahim (born 1990), South African cricketer
Zahir Abrahim (born 1972), South African cricketer

Given name
Abrahim Simmonds, Jamaican advocate
Abrahim Najmeddine, Moroccan footballer
Abrahim Yango (born 1996), Liberian-born Australian footballer

Given names